Richdale is a hamlet in Alberta, Canada. Richdale may also refer to:
Jace Richdale, an American producer and writer
Lancelot Eric Richdale (1900–1983), a New Zealand teacher and amateur ornithologist
Richdale Estates, Alberta, Canada, a locality
Richdale, Minnesota, an unincorporated community in the United States